Bir Mcherga ( Arabic : بئر مشارڨة ) is a town and commune in the Zaghouan Governorate, Tunisia in the northwest of Tunisia, the site of former Roman North African city and bishopric Giufi, which only remains as Latin Catholic titular see.

It is located fifty kilometers southwest of Tunis at 36° 31 'north, 9° 58 'east, in the Zaghouan Governorate. As of 2004 it had a population of 7,203.

Modern town 
Bir Mchergais is a municipality of 7203 inhabitants and the chief town of a 'delegation' of 21 508 inhabitants comprising several sectors including that of Djebel Oust.

The city participates in the loosening of the industrial activities of the capital, notably because of its situation on the RN3 .  With Djebel Oust, it hosts three large industrial zones on more than 300 hectares.  Its labor force employs more than 35% in industry (21% nationally).

Bir Mcherga is located a few kilometers from the dam of Bir Mcherga, one of two dams on the Wadi Miliane, located 35 kilometers from its mouth in the Gulf of Tunis  Benefiting from a watershed of 1,442 km 2, its reservoir lake irrigatean area of 1,600 hectares while avoiding the flood spectrum for the capital.

History 
Giufi was among the many cities of sufficient importance to become a suffragan diocese in the Roman province of Africa Proconsularis, in the papal sway.

It historically documented bishops were, as phrased in the sources :
 Victor, episcopus plebis Iufitanae, who intervened at the Council of Carthage called in 411, among the Catholic bishops, without schismatic counterpart of the disputed and condemned heresy Donatism
 Fortunius, episcopus ecclesiae Ofitanae, participant at the African council of 646 which pronounced against monothelitism as a heresy on instigation of monk Maximus the Confessor.

 Titular see 

The diocese was nominally restored in 1933 as Latin titular bishopric of Giufi (Latin = Curiate Italian) / Giufitan(us) (Latin adjective).

 See also 
 Giufi Salaria
 List of Catholic dioceses in Algeria

 References 

 Sources and external links 
 GCatholic - (former and) titular see
 Bibliography - ecclesiastical history
 J. Mesnage, L'Afrique chrétienne'', Paris 1912, p. 108

Communes of Tunisia
Populated places in Zaghouan Governorate
Catholic titular sees in Africa